Imatu is a village in Alutaguse Parish, Ida-Viru County in northeastern Estonia.

See also
Lake Imatu

References

 

Villages in Ida-Viru County